John Gatfield (born 15 June 1990) is a former swimmer and current swimming coach from New Zealand. At age 13, Gatfield was the youngest person to swim Cook Strait. Gatfield is a multiple-time New Zealand and Australian Age Swimming Champion, finaling at the Fina World Junior Championships in 2008 and medaling at the 2009 Fina World Cup in Singapore in the 200m IM.

At 24, Gatfield was named Head Coach of Coast Swim Club NZ, placing swimmers on Commonwealth Games and World Championship Teams.

In 2018, Gatfield was named as Assistant Head Coach of the powerhouse swimming club St Peter's Western QLD, Australia, a team that has produced multiple Olympic, Commonwealth and World Champions.

Gatfield was named as Team Coach to the 2019 Fina World Championships in Gwanju, Korea.

References

Living people
1990 births
Sportspeople from Upper Hutt
New Zealand male medley swimmers
Cook Strait swimmers
New Zealand long-distance swimmers
New Zealand lifesaving athletes